HAŠK (full name Hrvatski akademski športski klub) was a Croatian football club established in Zagreb in 1903 which ceased operating in 1945. The club was one of the most successful sides in Zagreb and the Kingdom of Yugoslavia in the period between the two World Wars. Since then several sports clubs have claimed to descend from it, the most significant of which is HAŠK Mladost sports society.

History

Early days

HAŠK was founded as a multi-sports club in November 1903 by nine Zagreb students (August Adam, Dragutin Albrecht, Petar Čerlek, Vjekoslav Jurković, Marko Kostrenčić, Krešimir Miskić, Oskar Mohr, Lav Wodwarška and Hinko Würth) who are today seen as pioneers of organized sports at the University of Zagreb. The club's purpose was to popularize sports among Croatian students, as well as to counter the ongoing   magyarization of Croatian public life, since Croatia was at the time part of the Austro-Hungarian Empire. The club's colours were red, white and golden, chosen to represent the colours of Croatian provinces.

At first, the club had sections for fencing, ice-skating, skiing, sledding and sports shooting, but ever since football was introduced in the spring of 1904, it became the most popular and well-known department of the club. The club played its first official game on 16 October 1906 against PNIŠK Zagreb (Prvi nogometni i športski klub Zagreb, First football and sports club Zagreb) which ended in a 1–1 draw in front of 800 spectators.

The club played many non-league games against local sides and against foreign opponents in the following years, such as the game against BEAC (The University of Budapest sports club) in 1909. When the first Croatian football championship was started in 1912, HAŠK were heading the table in mid-season and were later declared champions as the competition was abandoned after the winter break due to poor organization. The championship was never relaunched, and during World War I the club went on hiatus.

Revival and demise
In the period from 1918 to 1945 the club grew in popularity and membership, and in the years following the war new sections for track and field athletics, tennis, swimming, field hockey, cycling, table tennis, and motorsport were formed. After experiencing a financial crisis in the 1920s and a fire that destroyed stands on their ground in the summer of 1936, the following decade saw immediate revival and the time of HAŠK's greatest success.

The first success came in 1923 when they won the first edition of the Yugoslav Cup, named back then as the King Alexander Cup.  The club will regularly compete in the Yugoslav First League since 1927, and their finest hour came in the 1937–38 season when they won the Yugoslav title. They even went on to compete in the 1938 Mitropa Cup, when they were knocked out in the first round of the tournament by the Czechoslovakian side SK Kladno with 5:2 on aggregate. On a local level, in the period from 1911 to 1945 the club played a total of 120 matches against city rivals Građanski. Their last game was a 2–2 draw on 10 April 1945, just before both clubs were disbanded by the communist government.

The newly formed Dinamo Zagreb, which was established by the authorities two months later, took over HAŠK's Maksimir ground (originally opened in May 1912), along with many players who switched from Građanski or HAŠK to Dinamo. Other sports sections of the club were renamed FD Akademičar (Academic Sports Society) and later merged with ASD Mladost (Youth Academic Sports Society) which survives today as the HAŠK Mladost sports society, most famous for their later water polo and volleyball success on both the national and continental levels.

The most prominent of HAŠK's football players who later joined Dinamo was Zlatko Čajkovski, who spent the next 11 seasons playing for Zagreb's powerhouse. Dinamo's current youth academy and training ground located next to their stadium both bear the name Hitrec-Kacian, in honour of two HAŠK players, Ico Hitrec and Ratko Kacian.

Post-Yugoslavia
After the fall of communism and in the midst of the breakup of Yugoslavia, the club was reactivated and officially registered in November 1990, but in name only – no sports activities were started as the new club leadership centered their activities on promoting HAŠK's legacy and organizing events intended to raise the public awareness of the contribution HAŠK has made to the development of sports in Croatia. In an attempt to revive their glory days, the newly restarted club decided to enter competition sports again in 1993 so they merged with a local amateur football side called NK TPK from the Peščenica neighbourhood of Zagreb.  In 2006 they merged again with the Druga HNL side NK Naftaš Ivanić from Ivanić Grad to form the present day NK HAŠK, currently a second tier club in the Croatian football league system. They play their games at the Donje Svetice ground in Zagreb, which has a capacity of 3,000.

Managers
1913–15: František Koželuh
1930: Josef Uridil
1932–33: Johann Strnad
1937–38: Zoltán Opata
Rudolf Rupec
1943-44: Ratko Kacian

Honours
 Croatian First League: 1  
 1912. 
 Kingdom of Yugoslavia Champions: 1
 1937–38
 King Aleksander Cup: 1
 1923

Presidents
Hinko Würth (1903)
Vladimir Rukavina
Levin Polc
Branko Arko
Zvonko Kunz
Marko Krema
Branko Domac (1911-1913)
Hinko Würth (1913-1920)
Milorad Stražnicky
Stjepan Miletić Mlinarić
Marijan Dujmović
Mato Vene Starčević
Lovro Celio-Cega
Vjekoslav Župančić (1943–1945)

See also
HAŠK's contemporaries:
Građanski Zagreb (HAŠK's biggest city rivals, banned in 1945)
Concordia Zagreb (HAŠK's other city rivals, also banned in 1945)
Yugoslav First League (the Kingdom of Yugoslavia national football league that HAŠK successfully competed in through the 1920s and 1930s)

HAŠK's legacy:
Dinamo Zagreb (Today's most successful Croatian football club based in Zagreb, which took over HAŠK's ground and some of their players in 1945)
Naftaš HAŠK (Today's successor of the historic HAŠK football section)
HAŠK Mladost (Today's successor of HAŠK's other sports sections)

References

External links
 Official website 

Association football clubs established in 1903
Association football clubs disestablished in 1945
Defunct football clubs in Croatia
Football clubs in Zagreb
Football clubs in Yugoslavia
1903 establishments in Croatia
1945 disestablishments in Croatia